Carlos Andrés Segovia y Corral, 2nd Marquis of Salobreña (born 22 May 1970), is a Spanish nobleman and academic specialising in philosophy and religious studies.

Segovia y Corral is an independent philosopher and scholar, formerly (between 2013 and 2020) associate professor of religious studies at Saint Louis University in Madrid, Spain, and currently lecturer in philosophy at that same university.

While over the past ten years he has mostly worked on late-antique religion (with special emphasis on the intertwining of group-identity markers, sectarian boundaries, discursive strategies, and more generally the conceptualisation of hybridity and ambiguity in religious origins, as a means to counter present-day religious fundamentalism, ethnocentrism, and xenophobia), Segovia y Corral's current research focuses instead on post-nihilism and meta-conceptuality at the crossroads of ontology, epistemology, modal philosophy, and the philosophy of mythology, with special emphasis on early Greek thought, Plato, Fichte, Nietzsche, the later Heidegger, and French structuralism and its marginalia against the backdrop of contemporary discussions on determinacy, indeterminacy, compossibility, and worlding. He is also series co- editor of Apocalypticism: Cross-disciplinary Explorations at Peter Lang.

Segovia y Corral is the author of numerous scholarly books and articles, including the monographs Dionysus and Apollo after Nihilism: Rethinking the Earth–World Divide, Immanence and the Sacred, The Quranic Noah and the Making of the Islamic Prophet: A Study of Intertextuality and Religious Identity Formation in Late Antiquity, and The Quranic Jesus: A New Interpretation; the edited journal topical issues Conceptual Personae in Ontology  and From Worlds of Possibles to Possible Worlds: On Post-nihilism and Dwelling; the edited volume Remapping Emergent Islam: Texts, Social Settings, and Ideological Trajectories; and articles such as "Spinoza as Savage Thought,"  "Post-Heideggerian Drifts: From Object-Oriented-Ontology Worldlessness to Post-Nihilist Worldings,"  “Earth and World(s): From Heidegger’s Fourfold to Contemporary Anthropology,”  "Rethinking Dionnysus and Apollo: Redrawing Today's Philosophical Board,"  "Guattari \ Heidegger: On Quaternities, Deterritorialisation and Worlding", "From Worlds of Possibles to Possible Worlds – or, Dionysus and Apollo after Nihilism,"  "Paul and the Plea for Contingency in Contemporary Philosophy: A Philosophical and Anthropological Critique,"  "Tupi or Not Tupi – That is the Question: On Semiocannibalism, Its Variants, and their Logics,"  "Impromptu: The Alien – Heraclitus's Cut,"  "Fire in Three Images, from Heraclitus to the Anthropocene,"  "Four Cosmopolitical Ideas for an Unworlded World,"  "The New Animism: Experimental, Isomeric, Liminal, and Chaosmic,"  and "Rethinking Death’s Sacredness: From Heraclitus’s frag. DK B62 to Robert Gardner’s Dead Birds";  also writes regularly about philosophy at polymorph.blog.

Carlos Andrés Segovia y Corral is the youngest child of the celebrated classical guitarist Andrés Segovia, the first Marquis of Salobreña.

Notes

External links 
 Academia.edu

1970 births
20th-century anthropologists
20th-century Spanish economists
20th-century essayists
20th-century Spanish educators
20th-century Spanish historians
20th-century Spanish male writers
20th-century Spanish philosophers
21st-century anthropologists
21st-century Spanish  economists
21st-century essayists
21st-century political scientists
21st-century social scientists
21st-century Spanish educators
21st-century Spanish historians
21st-century Spanish male writers
21st-century Spanish philosophers
Continental philosophers
Critical theorists
Deleuze scholars
Epistemologists
Heidegger scholars
Historians of Christianity
Historians of Islam
Historians of Jews and Judaism
Independent scholars
Literacy and society theorists
Living people
Logicians
Metaphilosophers
Metaphysicians
Metaphysics writers
Ontologists
Philosophers of culture
Philosophers of economics
Philosophers of education
Philosophers of history
Philosophers of Judaism
Philosophers of logic
Philosophers of nihilism
Philosophers of religion
Philosophers of social science
Philosophy academics
Saint Louis University faculty
Semioticians
Social commentators
Social philosophers
Spanish anthropologists
Spanish bloggers
Spanish educators
Spanish essayists
Spanish historians of philosophy
Spanish historians of religion
Spanish male non-fiction writers
Spanish nobility
Spanish orientalists
Spanish political philosophers
Spanish political scientists
Spanish political writers
Spinoza scholars
Theorists on Western civilization
Trope theorists
Writers about activism and social change
Writers about globalization
Writers about religion and science